Bud Brown was an American Negro league outfielder between 1918 and 1922.

Brown played in parts of three seasons for the Homestead Grays between 1918 and 1922. In five recorded games, he posted two hits in 12 plate appearances.

References

External links
Baseball statistics and player information from Baseball-Reference Black Baseball Stats and Seamheads

Year of birth missing
Year of death missing
Place of birth missing
Place of death missing
Homestead Grays players
Baseball outfielders